The Women's Irish Junior Cup is a knockout trophy played for by women's field hockey clubs in Ireland, under the auspices of the Irish Hockey Association. Entry is open to sides that do not qualify for the Women's Irish Senior Cup and to the second teams of clubs that play in the Irish Senior Cup. 
The trophy was first played for in 1909.

Trophy
The winners are presented with the White Cup. The trophy was presented to the Irish Ladies Hockey Union in 1909 by Mrs .... White LLD.

Historical format

From its start in 1909 until 2000, the tournament was played in regional tournaments. The winners of the provincial Junior Cups in Leinster and Munster, Ulster and a club from Connacht would proceed through to semi-final matches. The finals were played in one weekend until 2000.

When the Northern Ireland Ladies Hockey Union finally amalgamated with the Ulster Women's Hockey Union, the Ulster representatives were decided by the McConnell Shield competition.

Current format

In 2000 the format of the competition was changed to an open draw format.

Finals

(records are incomplete)

1910s

1920s

1930s

1940s

1950s

1960s

1970s

1980s

1990s

2000s

2010s

Sources

External links

 Irish Hockey Association Irish Junior Cup Section

!
Junior Cup
1909 establishments in Ireland